Thomas Hall (June 6, 1869 – December 4, 1958) was a United States Republican politician who served in the United States House of Representatives. He also served as the North Dakota Secretary of State for two different periods, each lasting 12 years.

Biography
Thomas Hall was born in Cliff Mine, Michigan. He came to North Dakota with his parents in 1883, and was educated in Stutsman County schools and Concordia College in Moorhead, Minnesota. He served as the Secretary of State of North Dakota from 1913 to 1924.  He was elected as a Republican to the United States House of Representatives from North Dakota to fill the vacancy caused by the resignation of George M. Young and served from November 4, 1924 to March 3, 1933. He was again Secretary of State of North Dakota from 1943 until 1954, when he retired. He was the oldest Secretary of State to serve the state when he left office at age 85. He died in Bismarck, North Dakota in 1958 at age 89.

Family
Hall was married to Anna M. Grafstein of Jamestown on September 1, 1897. She died on September 28, 1944. They had four children; Richard Hall, Lucille Blunt, Ellen Hornthal, and Edna Rumreich.

References

Notes

External links
Thomas Hall (1869–1958) entry at The Political Graveyard

1869 births
1958 deaths
Secretaries of State of North Dakota
People from Stutsman County, North Dakota
Concordia College (Moorhead, Minnesota) alumni
Republican Party members of the United States House of Representatives from North Dakota
20th-century American politicians